The Christian Licorice Store is a 1971 American drama film directed by James Frawley and starring Beau Bridges and Maud Adams. The title of the film is based on lyrics from the song "Pleasant Street" by Tim Buckley who makes a cameo in the film.

Plot
Promising tennis pro Franklin Cane lives in Los Angeles and is mentored by his coach, Jonathan "J.C." Carruthers, who warns him of the perils of success. J.C. advises him to concentrate on his game and not on outside interests, such as a lucrative offer to endorse a hair spray in a TV ad.

Cane takes his advice. He wins a tournament in Houston and has a one-night stand there with a girl, cheating on Cynthia Vicstrom, the photographer he has been seeing. Things are going well for Cane until one day J.C. dies peacefully in his sleep.

A distraught Cane begins going to wild California parties and spending time on Hollywood interests, neglecting Cynthia and his tennis. Cynthia breaks up with him and begins seeing Monroe, a film director who has fallen for her. Cane leaves a party with a girl he's just met, drives down the Pacific Coast Highway at a high speed, then crashes, killing them both. The next time she turns on a TV, Cynthia sees him in a breakfast-drink ad.

Cast
 Beau Bridges as Franklin Cane
 Maud Adams as Cynthia
 Gilbert Roland as J.C.
 Allan Arbus as Monroe
 Jean Renoir as himself
 Monte Hellman as Joseph

Release
The film opened November 24, 1971 at the Paris Theatre in Boston, Massachusetts and at four theaters in Detroit, Michigan.

See also
 List of American films of 1971

References

External links

1971 films
1971 comedy-drama films
American comedy-drama films
Films directed by James Frawley
Cinema Center Films films
Films scored by Lalo Schifrin
Tennis films
Films produced by Michael Laughlin
1971 directorial debut films
1971 comedy films
1971 drama films
Films with screenplays by Floyd Mutrux
Films produced by Floyd Mutrux
1970s English-language films
1970s American films